Robert Wilson Patridge served in the Oregon House of Representatives from 1999 to 2005 as a Republican from Jackson County. Since 2013 he has served as the District Attorney of Klamath County and serves as the Chair of the Oregon Liquor Control Commission.

References 

Republican Party members of the Oregon House of Representatives
Living people
Year of birth missing (living people)
Willamette University alumni
Politicians from Salem, Oregon
Willamette University College of Law alumni
District attorneys in Oregon
Lawyers from Salem, Oregon